Whatcha Gonna Do? is the second studio album by San Diego-based American rapper Jayo Felony. It was released on August 25, 1998 via Def Jam Records. The eighteen-track record features guest appearances from DMX, E-40, Kokane, 8Ball & MJG, Method Man & Redman, and Westside Connection.

The album was a critical and commercial success, making it to number 46 on the Billboard 200 and number 8 on the Top R&B/Hip-Hop Albums chart. Its self-titled DJ Silk-produced hit single "What'cha Gonna Do?" with Method Man and DMX was included in Hav Plenty soundtrack and peaked at number 45 on the R&B/Hip-Hop Airplay. An E-A-Ski-produced single "Nitty Gritty" peaked at number 1 on the Bubbling Under R&B/Hip-Hop Songs chart.

Track listing

Notes
Track 3 contains samples from "Unhooked Generation" by Freda Payne (1970)
Track 4 contains samples from "Heartbreaker (Part I, Part II)" (1983) and "More Bounce to the Ounce" (1980) by Zapp 
Track 5 contains samples from "Jail House Rap" by The Fat Boys (1984)
Track 7 contains samples from "Five Minutes of Funk" by Whodini (1984)
Track 11 contains samples from "Mystery" by Anita Baker (1986)
Track 15 contains samples from "Just Don't Bite It" by N.W.A (1990)

Personnel

Anthony "T-Funk" Pearyer - producer (tracks: 2, 11, 17)
Chris Gehrigner - mastering
Clifford Smith - guest artist (track 4)
Dedrick D'Mon Rolison - guest artist (tracks: 6, 14)
Earl Simmons - guest artist (track 4)
Earl Stevens - guest artist (track 17)
Greg Royal - mixing
James Savage - main artist, executive producer, producer (tracks: 5, 12, 16)
Jerry B. Long Jr. - guest artist (track 13)
Kenny McCloud - engineer
Mark Ogleton - producer (tracks: 7-8, 14-15)
Marlon Jermaine Goodwin - guest artist (track 3)
O'Shea Jackson - guest artist (track 17)
Premro Smith - guest artist (track 3)
Reggie Noble - guest artist (track 6)
Russell Brown - producer (tracks: 1, 4-6, 9-10, 13, 18)
Shon Adams - producer (tracks: 7-8, 14-15)
Tina Davis - executive producer
Triston Jones - producer (track 3)
William Loshawn Calhoun, Jr. - guest artist (track 6)

Charts
Album

Singles

References

External links 

1998 albums
Jayo Felony albums
Def Jam Recordings albums
Albums produced by E-A-Ski